William Drexel Duke (born 1958) is an American mathematician specializing in number theory.

Duke studied at the University of New Mexico and then at New York University (Courant Institute), from which he received his Ph.D. in 1986 under the direction of Peter Sarnak.  After a postdoctoral stint at the University of California, San Diego he joined the faculty of Rutgers University, where he stayed until becoming a Professor of Mathematics at the University of California, Los Angeles.  Since 2015 he has been Chair of the mathematics department at UCLA.

Honors
Duke gave an Invited Address at the 1998 International Congress of Mathematicians in Berlin.  Duke gave an AMS Invited Address at a 2001 Fall sectional meeting of the American Mathematical Society in Irvine, California. He was selected as a fellow of the American Mathematical Society in 2016 "for contributions to analytic number theory and the theory of automorphic forms".

Duke is an Editorial Board Member for the book series "Monographs in Number Theory" published by World Scientific.

Students 

 Amanda Folsom

Selected publications

 Duke, W. (1988) Hyperbolic distribution problems and half-integral weight Maass forms, Inventiones Mathematicae, 92, 73–90.
 Duke, W., Schulze-Pillot, R. (1993) Representation of integers by positive ternary quadratic forms and equidistribution of lattice points on ellipsoids, Duke Mathematical Journal, 71, 143–179.
 Duke, W., Friedlander, J., Iwaniec, H. (1993) Bounds for automorphic L-functions, Inventiones Mathematicae, 112, 1–8.
 Duke, W., Friedlander, J., Iwaniec, H. (1994) Bounds for automorphic L-functions II, Inventiones Mathematicae, 115, 219–239.
 Duke, W., Friedlander, J., Iwaniec, H. (1995), Equidistribution of roots of a quadratic congruence to prime moduli, Annals of Mathematics, 141, 423–441.
 Duke, W. (1995) The critical order of vanishing of automorphic L-functions with large level, Inventiones Mathematicae,  119, 165–174.
 Duke, W., Kowalski, E. (2000), A problem of Linnik for elliptic curves and mean-value estimates for automorphic representations.  With an appendix by Dinakar Ramakrishnan, Inventiones Mathematicae, 139, 1–39.
 Duke, W., Friedlander, J., Iwaniec, H. (2002), The subconvexity problem for Artin L-functions, Inventiones Mathematicae,  149, 489–577.

References

External links
William Duke's webpage at UCLA

1958 births
Living people
Number theorists
University of New Mexico alumni
Courant Institute of Mathematical Sciences alumni
Rutgers University faculty
University of California, Los Angeles faculty
Fellows of the American Mathematical Society
Mathematicians from California